is a lake in the northeast area of the Shimane Prefecture in Japan. It is enclosed by the Shimane Peninsula to the north, and the Izumo and Matsue plains to the west and east respectively.  of wetland are a Ramsar Site.

Lake Shinji offers an economic benefit to nearby residents in the form of active fisheries and mild tourism opportunities, such as the various hot spring resorts built along the lake's coast and sunset cruises offered by local companies.

Lake Shinji is connected to the Sea of Japan via Nakaumi Lagoon, and as a result is made up of brackish water of good quality, which adds to the abundance of aquatic life, such as whitebait, eel, sea bass, and the most famous Lake Shinji delicacy, the Shijimi clam (Corbicula japonica). The Shijimi shellfish is caught using a 'joren', a tool unique to Lake Shinji, which is made up of a basket tethered to a rake. The shellfish is often referred to as one of the 'Shiji-ko Shitchin', the 'Seven Delicacies of Lake Shinji.'

References

Shinji
Landforms of Shimane Prefecture
Shinji